Arvada is a home rule municipality located in Jefferson and Adams counties, Colorado, United States. The city population was 124,402 at the 2020 United States Census, with 121,510 residing in Jefferson County and 2,892 residing in Adams County. Arvada is the seventh most populous city in Colorado. The city is a part of the Denver–Aurora–Lakewood, CO Metropolitan Statistical Area and the Front Range Urban Corridor. The Olde Town Arvada historic district is 7 miles (11 km) northwest of the Colorado State Capitol in Denver.

History

The first documented discovery of gold in the Rocky Mountain region occurred on June 22, 1850, when Lewis Ralston, a Georgia prospector headed for the California gold fields, dipped his sluice pan into a small stream near its mouth at Clear Creek. Ralston found about 1/4 ounce (6 g) of gold, then worth about five dollars. Ralston's companions named the stream Ralston's Creek in his honor, but they all left the next morning, drawn by the lure of California gold.

During the Pike's Peak Gold Rush in 1858, Ralston brought another group of prospectors back to the site of his first discovery. The placer gold in the area soon played out, but hard rock deposits of gold were found in the mountains to the west. Some of the miners abandoned their search for gold and returned to farm the rich bottom land along Ralston Creek and Clear Creek. They found an eager market for their crops among other gold seekers. The Territory of Colorado was formed on February 28, 1861, and the farms in the valley expanded to feed the growing population of the region.

On December 1, 1870, Benjamin F. Wadsworth and Louis A. Reno platted the Ralston Point townsite along the railroad. To avoid confusion with other communities along Ralston Creek, Ralston Point was soon renamed Arvada in honor of Hiram Arvada Haskin, brother-in-law of settler Mary Wadsworth. Her husband, Benjamin Wadsworth, became the first postmaster of Arvada. Colorado was granted statehood on August 1, 1876, and the Town of Arvada was formally incorporated on August 14, 1904. A vibrant agricultural community, Arvada was once known as the "Celery Capital of the World."

Arvada grew rapidly during the latter half of the 20th century as a suburb of nearby Denver, the state capital. Arvada became a Statutory City on October 31, 1951, and a Home Rule Municipality on July 23, 1963. By the end of the millennium, the population of Arvada exceeded 100,000.

Missionary shooting

On December 9, 2007, Matthew J. Murray walked into the Youth With a Mission Center in Arvada and, after he was refused his request to stay overnight in the dormitories, opened fire and killed two people, injuring two more.

A memorial was held the following Wednesday, December 12, in which Youth With a Mission leaders forgave Murray's family for what happened.

Olde Town Square shooting
On Monday, June 21, 2021, Ronald Troyke fatally shot Arvada police officer Gordon Beesley with a semi-automatic shotgun. Troyke then returned to his truck and retrieved an AR-15 rifle. As Troyke proceeded down the street, bystander Johnny Hurley fatally shot Troyke with a handgun. When Hurley picked up Troyke's rifle, Arvada police officer  Kraig Brownlow arrived on the scene and fatally shot Hurley, mistaking him for Beesley's shooter. Troyke was targeting Arvada police officers in general, but his motive has not been determined. On November 8, 2021, authorities have decided not to press charges against Brownlow for killing Hurley. Troyke had reportedly been seen recording police at crime scenes.

Geography
Arvada is located in northeastern Jefferson County at  (39.819962, -105.110975). A small portion of the city extends east into Adams County.

Climate
The climate is described as Humid Continental by the Köppen Climate System, abbreviated as Dfb.

Demographics

As of the census of 2010, there were 106,433 people, 42,701 households, and 28,927 families residing in the city. The racial makeup of the city was 89.08% White, 0.9% African American, 0.8% Native American, 2.2% Asian, 0.1% Pacific Islander, 3.5% from other races, and 2.7% from two or more races. Hispanic or Latino of any race were 13.7% of the population.

There were 44,427 households, out of which 31.9% had children under the age of 18 living with them, 52.5% were married couples living together, 10.7% had a female householder with no husband present, and 32.3% were non-families. 26.3% of all households were made up of individuals, and 9.8% had someone living alone who was 65 years of age or older. The average household size was 2.48 and the average family size was 3.00.

In the city the population's ages were spread out, with 23.4% under the age of 18, 5.5% from 20 to 24, 25.1% from 25 to 44, 29.8% from 45 to 64, and 13.8% who were 65 years of age or older. The median age was 40.5 years. There were 51,984 males and 54,539 Females.

The median income for a household in the city was $66,125 and the median income for a family was $78,591. Males had a median income of $42,126 versus $30,802 for females. The per capita income for the city was $24,679. About 4.6% of families and 6.4% of the population were below the poverty line.

Government
The City of Arvada is a Home Rule Municipality with a council–manager form of government. The Arvada City Council has seven members: a mayor and two councilmembers elected at large, and four councilmembers elected from council districts.

The City Council selects the city manager. The Arvada City Manager is Lorie Gillis.

Economy

Arvada is predominately a commuter town to Denver and Boulder. The Regional Transportation District (RTD) G line electric multiple unit commuter rail connects Arvada directly to Denver Union Station. RTD also serves Arvada with 13 bus routes. The primary retail corridors are along Wadsworth Boulevard, 52nd Avenue, 64th Avenue, Ralston Road, and Kipling Street.

Education
Arvada is served by the Jefferson County School District R-1.

Industry 
The Rocky Flats plant operated from 1952 to 1992, as a manufacturing complex that produced nuclear weapons.

Tourism and recreation 
Attractions include:
Arvada Center for the Arts and Humanities
Cussler Museum rare automobile collection
Olde Town Arvada historic district
Rocky Flats National Wildlife Refuge
Two Ponds National Wildlife Refuge

Transportation
Arvada is the western terminus of Interstate 76, which begins at the intersection of Interstate 70 and State Highway 121. Other state highways in Arvada include SH 72, SH 93,  and SH 95. Major highways near Arvada include Interstate 25, Interstate 270, U.S. Highway 36 and U.S. Highway 287.

The Amtrak California Zephyr passes through Arvada westbound each morning and eastbound each evening. This route through the scenic heart of the Rocky Mountains is one of the most popular rail routes in the United States. Full Amtrak passenger and parcel service is available at the nearby Denver Union Station.

Arvada is served by Denver International Airport and nearby Rocky Mountain Metropolitan Airport.

In 2014 the League of American Bicyclists designated Arvada as a Silver Level Bicycle Friendly Community.

Notable people

Notable individuals who were born or have lived in Arvada include guitarist Roc Hillman (who played in the Jimmy Dorsey and Kay Kyser bands during the big band era), novelist Clive Cussler, Joe King, baseball pitcher Roy Halladay, Isaac Slade of the rock band The Fray, and professional golfer and U.S. Olympic track and field gold medalist Babe Didrikson Zaharias.

Sister cities

Arvada's sister cities are:
 Jinzhou, China
 Kyzylorda, Kazakhstan

See also

Colorado
Bibliography of Colorado
Index of Colorado-related articles
Outline of Colorado
List of counties in Colorado
List of municipalities in Colorado
List of places in Colorado
List of statistical areas in Colorado
Front Range Urban Corridor
North Central Colorado Urban Area
Denver-Aurora, CO Combined Statistical Area
Denver-Aurora-Lakewood, CO Metropolitan Statistical Area
Arvada Center for the Arts and Humanities
Olde Town Arvada historic district
Pike's Peak Gold Rush
Rocky Flats National Wildlife Refuge
Two Ponds National Wildlife Refuge

References

External links

City of Arvada website
Arvada Center for the Arts and Humanities website
CDOT map of Arvada

 
1858 establishments in Kansas Territory
Cities in Colorado
Cities in Adams County, Colorado
Cities in Jefferson County, Colorado
Denver metropolitan area
Populated places established in 1858
Russian communities in the United States
Ukrainian communities in the United States